The Ministry of War (also commonly translated as the "Military Ministry" or Board) was created 1744 to unify the Armed Forces of Saudi Arabia under one administrative structure. In 1933 it was renamed as the "Defense Agency" under the Ministry of Finance and headed by a Director-General. A few years later, the Agency was renamed as the Ministry of Defense.

Ministers
 Abdulaziz bin Muhammad (1745–1765)
 Abdullah bin Muhammad (1765–1773)
 Saud al-Kabeer (1773–1803)
 Abdullah bin Saud (1803–1814)
 Mishari bin Saud (1814–1816)
 Faisal bin Saud (1816–1818)
 Turki bin Abdullah (1819–1828)
 Faisal bin Turki (1828–1838)
 Khalid bin Saud (1838–1841) 
 Abdullah bin Thunayan (1841–1843)
 Abdullah al-Faisal (1843–1845)
 Galloway bin Turki (1845–1850)
 Saud al-Faisal (1850–1868)
 Muhammad al-Faisal (1868–1875)
 Abdul Rahman al-Faisal (1875–1886)
 Faisal bin Abdul Rahman (1886–1889)
 Khalid bin Abdul Rahman (1889–1891)
 Fahd bin Abdul Rahman (1891–1901)
 Abdulaziz bin Abdul-Rahman (1901–1921)
 Muhammad bin Abdul-Rahman (1921–1933)

See also
Ministry of Defense
General Staff Presidency
Military Service Council

References

Further reading

Former defence ministries
Armed Forces of Saudi Arabia
Military history of Saudi Arabia
Ministries established in 1745
19th century in Saudi Arabia
Ministries disestablished in 1933
20th century in Saudi Arabia
Former government ministries of Saudi Arabia
18th-century establishments in the Arabian Peninsula